The Australian Book Industry Strategy Group (BISG) is an initiative of the Australian government to examine the impact of the digital age on the country's book publishing industry.

Background 
The Australian Minister for Innovation, Industry, Science and Research, Senator Kim Carr, established the Australian Book Industry Strategy Group in 2010. The group conducted market analysis research, took public submissions and held Stakeholder Workshops in which over 200 industry representatives participated. The BISG delivered its final report to Carr in September 2011. Following a launch at Parliament House, Canberra, the report was released to the public on 9 November 2011. It contains both recommendations to the Australian government and proposed actions for the publishing industry.

Membership of the BISG 
The BISG is chaired by writer, lawyer, and former politician Barry Jones. The group's members are:
Louise Adler, chief executive officer, Melbourne University Publishing
Philip Andersen, chief executive officer, Printing Industries Association of Australia
David Barnett, chief executive officer, Australia/NZ, Pearson Education Australia
Lorraine Cassin, Printing Division secretary, Australian Manufacturing Workers Union
Graeme Connelly, chief executive officer, Melbourne University Bookshop / Chair, Australian Campus Booksellers Association
Tom Crago, chief executive officer, Tantalus Media
Alan Fahy, chief executive officer, McPherson's Printing Group
David Fenlon, group managing director, REDgroup Retail
David Gaunt, co-owner, Gleebooks
Ross Gibb, managing director, Macmillan Australia Group
Alexander Grant, independent chair and director, Copyright Agency Limited
Angelo Loukakis, executive director, Australian Society of Authors
Emmett Stinson, president, Small Press Underground Network Community
Christopher Warren, federal secretary, Media, Entertainment and Arts Alliance

References

External links 
 The Book Industry Strategy Group page on the Australian Government Website

Publishing in Australia
Digital media